Sirathu is a constituency of the Uttar Pradesh Legislative Assembly covering the city of Sirathu in the Kaushambi district of Uttar Pradesh, India.

Sirathu is one of five assembly constituencies in the Kaushambi Lok Sabha constituency. Since 2008, this assembly constituency is numbered 251 amongst 403 constituencies.

Members of Legislative Assembly

 1962: Hemwati Nandan Bahuguna, Indian National Congress
1967: Mangala Prasad Tiwari, Indian National Congress
1969: Ram Charan, Samyukta Socialist Party
1974: Baij Nath Kushwaha, Bharatiya Kranti Dal
1977: Baij Nath Kushwaha, Janata Party
1980: Jagdish Prasad, Indian National Congress (Indira)
1985: Purushottam Lal, Indian National Congress
1989: Radhey Shyam Bhartiya, Janata Dal
1991: Bhagirathi, Janata Dal
1993: Ram Sajiwan Nirmal, Bahujan Samaj Party 
1996: Matesh Chandra Sonker, Bahujan Samaj Party 
2002: Matesh Chandra Sonker, Bahujan Samaj Party 
2007: Wachaspati, Bahujan Samaj Party 
2012: Keshav Prasad Maurya, Bharatiya Janata Party
 2014 (by-poll) : Vachaspati, Samajwadi Party (By Poll)
 2017: Sheetla Prasad, Bharatiya Janata Party  

 2022: Pallavi Patel, Samajwadi Party

Election results

2022

2017

Bharatiya Janta Party candidate Sheetla Prasad won in 2017 Uttar Pradesh Legislative Elections defeating Samajwadi Party candidate Vachaspati by a margin of 26,203 votes.

2014 Bypoll

See also 

 Sirathu
 Kaushambi district
 Kaushambi Lok Sabha constituency

References

External links
 

Assembly constituencies of Uttar Pradesh
Kaushambi district